Ocean and Westgate (inbound) and Ocean and Cerritos (outbound) are a pair of one-way light rail stops on the Muni Metro K Ingleside line, located between the Mount Davidson and Ingleside Terrace neighborhoods of San Francisco, California. The stops consist of one side platform each, with the eastbound (outbound) platform located on Ocean Avenue west of the intersection with Westgate Drive and Cerritos Avenue, and vice versa. They originally opened around 1896 on the United Railroads 12 line; K Ingleside service began in 1919.

History 

The private Market Street Railway opened a branch – built in just six days – of its Mission Street line along Ocean Avenue to Victoria Street on December 4, 1895 to serve the new Ingleside Racetrack. The line was extended through less populated areas to the Ingleside House (where Ocean Avenue now meets Junipero Serra Boulevard) shortly thereafter. The 1906 earthquake damaged many cable car and streetcar lines; the URR resumed service on the Ocean Avenue (12) line on May 6, 1906.

On November 25, 1918, the city and the struggling URR signed the "Parkside Agreements", which allowed Muni streetcars to use URR trackage on Junipero Serra Boulevard, Ocean Avenue, and Taraval Street, in exchange for a cash payment and shared maintenance costs. The K Ingleside line was extended south on Junipero Serra Boulevard and east on Ocean to Ocean and Miramar on February 21, 1919. The city purchased the private company (renamed Market Street Railway in 1921) in 1944; route 12 service was removed from Ocean Avenue on April 8, 1945, leaving just the K Ingleside.

The line was closed and replaced by buses from February 2001 to June 7, 2003 for the Ocean Avenue Reconstruction and Improvement Project, a major street repaving and utility replacement project. Muni boarding islands were reconstructed at the stations along Ocean Avenue.

References

External links 

SFMTA – Ocean Ave & Westgate Dr, Ocean Ave & Cerritos Ave
SFBay Transit (unofficial) – Ocean Ave & Westgate Dr, Ocean Ave & Cerritos Ave

Muni Metro stations